Ruseiniai (formerly) is a village in Kėdainiai district municipality, in Kaunas County, in central Lithuania. According to the 2011 census, the village had a population of 20 people.

There is an ancient burial place where relics of horses and men, dated by 11th-16th centuries, have been found.

History
Ruseiniai has been known since 1595.

Demography

Images

References

Villages in Kaunas County
Kėdainiai District Municipality